Michael Haley (born 19 September 1987) is an English former rugby league footballer who played in the 2000s and 2010s.

Background
Haley was born in Leeds, West Yorkshire, England, he has Irish ancestors, and eligible to play for Ireland due to the grandparent rule..

Career
He has played for the Leeds Rhinos in the  Super League. He transferred from the Sheffield Eagles to the Featherstone Rovers during the winter of 2010, he suffered a severe injury to his knee in the Featherstone Rovers' win at Barrow, on 20 February 2011, returned just weeks later.

References

External links
 Hunslet profile
(archived by web.archive.org) Profile at featherstonerovers.net
(archived by web.archive.org) Sheffield Eagles profile
(archived by web.archive.org) Leeds Rhinos profile

1987 births
Living people
Doncaster R.L.F.C. players
English rugby league players
Featherstone Rovers players
Hunslet R.L.F.C. players
Ireland national rugby league team players
Leeds Rhinos players
Rugby league players from Leeds
Rugby league props
Sheffield Eagles players